Dryander is a national park in Queensland (Australia), 938 km northwest of Brisbane, and north of Proserpine. The most prominent mountain in the park is Mount Drylander and rises to 765 meters above sea level.

Wildlife 
The endangered Proserpine rock-wallaby has a refuge in the park. 52 species of plants have been recorded in the Dryander National Park.

References

Queensland Government - Department of Environment and Resource Management - Dryander National Park

See also

 Protected areas of Queensland

National parks of Queensland
Protected areas established in 1938
North Queensland